Helge Hammelow-Berg (born 25 April 1949) is a Norwegian television personality.

He is best known for hosting 446 editions of the TVNorge show Reisesjekken, the last in 1997. From 1997 to 2002 he was contracted to TV 2, where he received a paycheck without ever hosting a show.

In 1991 he was awarded the Se og Hør readers' TV personality of the year award.

He resides in Melsomvik.

References

1949 births
Living people
Norwegian television presenters
TVNorge people
People from Vestfold